Ibrahim Sissoko (born 29 November 1991) is an Ivorian professional footballer who plays as a winger. He represented the Ivory Coast U20s in the 2011 Toulon Tournament.

Club career

VfL Wolfsburg
Sissoko joined German side VfL Wolfsburg from Académica de Coimbra of the Portuguese Primeira Liga in January 2012 for a transfer fee of €1.5 million, after Wolfsburg activated his release clause.

Loan to Panathinaikos
Sissoko was not considered a first team regular at Wolfsburg and in July 2012 he was loaned out to the Greek side Panathinaikos for a year in order to "gain some match practice at a top club", as Wolfsburg manager Felix Magath said.

Loan to Saint-Étienne
Sissoko joined French side Saint-Étienne in July 2013 for a year on loan.

Eskişehirspor
On 26 August 2014, Sissoko signed a three-year contract with Eskişehirspor.

Doxa Katokopias
On 7 June 2017, Doxa Katokopias announced the signing of Sissoko.

Career statistics

Notes

Honours
Académica de Coimbra
Taça de Portugal: 2011–12

References

External links

1991 births
Living people
Footballers from Abidjan
Ivorian footballers
Association football wingers
Ivory Coast under-20 international footballers
Primeira Liga players
Bundesliga players
Super League Greece players
Ligue 1 players
Segunda División players
Süper Lig players
TFF First League players
Cypriot First Division players
Associação Académica de Coimbra – O.A.F. players
VfL Wolfsburg players
Panathinaikos F.C. players
AS Saint-Étienne players
Deportivo de La Coruña players
Eskişehirspor footballers
Konyaspor footballers
Doxa Katokopias FC players
Erzurumspor footballers
Akhisarspor footballers
Ivorian expatriate footballers
Ivorian expatriate sportspeople in Portugal
Expatriate footballers in Portugal
Ivorian expatriate sportspeople in Germany
Expatriate footballers in Germany
Ivorian expatriate sportspeople in Greece
Expatriate footballers in Greece
Ivorian expatriate sportspeople in France
Expatriate footballers in France
Ivorian expatriate sportspeople in Turkey
Expatriate footballers in Turkey
Ivorian expatriate sportspeople in Cyprus
Expatriate footballers in Cyprus